Siaržuk Vituška (10 April 1965 - 2 July 2012) was a prominent figure of the Belarusian independence movement in the late Soviet period, historian, columnist and writer.

Early life 
Vituška was born in the village of Čyść near Maładziečna in the North West of Soviet Belarus.

In 1989 he graduated from the Belarusian State University with a degree in History.

Belarusian Revival initiatives 
In 1986 Vituška joined Talaka and in 1987 was elected its chairman. Talaka was a cultural and educational youth organisation in Belarus in the late Soviet period. It was a predecessor and early part of the Perestroyka-inspired pro-independence movement in Soviet Belarus. Several key members of the Talaka later formed the Belarusian Popular Front, an anti-Soviet national movement.

Later life in Vilnius 
From 1991 Vituška works at a Belarusian school in Vilnius. He was a founder and the first director of the Ivan Łuckievič Belarusian museum in that city. He published a newspaper «Vilnia i kraj» (“Vilnius and Country”), participated in radio and TV programs and wrote articles for Belarusian newspapers Naša Niva («Наша Ніва») and Ruń («Рунь»).

In 2011 he published his children book “Ding Dong: Let’s Do Stories” («Дзінь-дзілінь: пара гуляць у казкі!»).

Death 
Vituška suffered from poor health in his late life and died on 2 July 2012 году in Vilnius. He is buried in the village of Rahava near Minsk.

References

Further reading 

 "Сёньня дзень памяці Сержука Вітушкі". Радыё Свабода (in Belarusian)
 "Сяржук Вітушка больш ня з намі". Радыё Свабода (in Belarusian)
 "Сяржук Вітушка (№37)". web.archive.org. 2013-06-19. 
 "Vincuk Viačorka: Сяржук Вітушка — узор беларускага інтэлігента". Новы Час.

1965 births
2012 deaths
Belarusian activists